Julia E. Ward (died 1921) was an American educator who served as the sixth president (referred to at that time as "principal") of Mount Holyoke College (then Mount Holyoke Female Seminary) from 1872 to 1883. She graduated from Mount Holyoke in 1857 and taught there for five years before becoming principal.

See also
Presidents of Mount Holyoke College

References

External links
Biography

1921 deaths
Mount Holyoke College alumni
Mount Holyoke College faculty
Presidents and Principals of Mount Holyoke College
Year of birth missing